Bible Grove may refer to the following places in the United States:
Bible Grove, Illinois
Bible Grove Township, Clay County, Illinois
Bible Grove, Missouri
Bible Grove Consolidated District No. 5 School